The Zastava M80 was a 5.56 mm assault rifle produced by Zastava Arms. The M80 had a fixed wooden stock while the M80A had an under-folding metal stock. It was introduced in the early 1980s. It was the 5.56 mm version of the Zastava M70, with a longer barrel, later improved in 1990 into the Zastava M90.

Design
It is gas-operated, supports semi-automatic and full-automatic rate of fire.

The M85 is a related compact carbine development of the M80, also chambered in the 5.56 mm round.

References

Sources

External links

Assault rifles of Yugoslavia
M80
5.56 mm assault rifles
Kalashnikov derivatives
Zastava Arms
Military equipment introduced in the 1980s